Mann Darius Tackitt (Tackett) and his  brother Pleasant Tackitt moved to Parker County, Texas, in 1854, and for a few years lived about 12 miles north of Weatherford, Texas. During 1858, they moved to Jack County, Texas, and settled on Boone's Creek, in the southwestern part of the county.

On October 26, 1863, during the early afternoon, J. H. Tackitt, a son of Mann Tackitt, went out in a southwesterly direction in search of stock. Shortly afterwards, his father, who was armed with a double-barreled gun, went north for the same purpose. Tackitt's gun was loaded with a ball on one side, and buck shot on the other. He was also armed with a pistol. When he had gone only about onea mile from his home, he found himself surrounded by 15 or 20 savage Indians. At first, he made an attempt to run home, but since his best horses had been stolen by the Indians, the Indians soon overtook him. Tackitt then dismounted to sell his life as dearly as possible, at a point within one-half mile of his own residence. He fought the warriors away for some time, as was shown by the circular trail some distance from the tree, behind which Tackitt, perhaps, held the Indians at bay until he discharged all of his loads, for seven or eight shots were heard at the residence.

When J.H. Tackett reached home, he was informed of the firing, and heard some of the shots himself. As a consequence,  a younger brother, Caleb, and he went out in search of their father, and it seems that Caleb, previous to this, had made an attempt to offer his father some assistance, but realized that it was of no avail, for the Indians were still on the ground. 

In a short time, J.H. and Caleb Tackett reached their father, who was already dead, stripped of a part of his clothing, but not scalped. His guns were gone, and many arrows were in the tree by which he stood, on the ground, and in his body. The boys hurried to the ranch for a wagon, notified the neighbors and arranged for a coffin to be made at Veal's Station, where he was buried.

A posse of citizens followed the Indian trail, and after going for, perhaps, half a mile, they found a dead savage, and indications disclosed others were wounded. The dead Indian was dragged to the Tackett ranch and stood against a tree some distance from the residence.

Many years after the death of Mann Tackitt, the metal part of his old double-barrelled gun was found a short distance from where the fight occurred.

References

Tackitt, Mann
Jack County, Texas